The 2021–22 season was Huddersfield Town's 113th year in their history and third consecutive season in the Championship. Along with the league, the club also competed in the FA Cup and the EFL Cup. The season covers the period from 1 July 2021 to 30 June 2022.

Following the departure of Christopher Schindler at the end of the previous season, Jonathan Hogg was confirmed as the new captain on 29 June 2021.

First-team squad
As of the end of the 2021–22 season.

Transfers

Transfers in

Loans in

Loans out

Transfers out

Pre-season friendlies
Huddersfield Town announced they would play friendly matches against Harrogate Town, Southport, a double header against Norwich City (later reduced to one game), Fleetwood Town, Crewe Alexandra and Oldham Athletic as part of their pre-season preparations. The games against Crewe and Oldham would later be cancelled due to Town arranging to have their EFL Cup match against Sheffield Wednesday played that same weekend.

Competitions

Overview

EFL Championship

League table

Results summary

Results by matchday

Matches
Huddersfield Town's fixtures were announced on 24 June 2021.

Play-offs

FA Cup

Huddersfield were drawn away to Burnley in the third round. They were then drawn to host Barnsley in the fourth round. They were then drawn away to Nottingham Forest in the fifth round, the first time since 2018 that the team qualified for the 5th round.

EFL Cup

Huddersfield Town were drawn at away to Sheffield Wednesday in the first round and at home to Everton in the second round.

Squad statistics

Awards

Huddersfield Town Blue & White Player of the Month Award
Awarded monthly to the player that was chosen by members of the Blue & White Members (formerly Blue & White Foundation) voting on htafc.com

EFL Awards
On 24 April 2022, Huddersfield goalkeeper Lee Nicholls was named in the EFL Championship Team of the Season at the EFL Awards.

References

Huddersfield Town
Huddersfield Town A.F.C. seasons